

United States Senate

United States House of Representatives

Governor

Incumbent Governor Sonny Perdue (R) was ineligible to seek re-election due to term limits. The Republican primary featured four candidates who received over 15% of the vote in the first round: former Secretary of State Karen Handel, former U.S. Representative Nathan Deal, former Georgia State Senator Eric Johnson, and Insurance Commissioner John Oxendine. Handel, Deal, and Johnson all resigned their offices during or shortly before the campaign. Because no candidate received a majority of the vote, the race went to a runoff between the top two candidates, Handel and Deal.

Deal won the runoff narrowly, with a margin of about 0.4%, or 2,519 votes out of 579,551 cast. The Democratic nomination was won easily by former Governor Roy Barnes without a runoff; his most prominent opponent was Attorney General Thurbert Baker.

In the general election, Deal defeated Barnes, becoming just the third Republican to be elected Governor of Georgia, after Perdue and Reconstruction-era governor Rufus Bullock.

Lieutenant Governor

Incumbent Lieutenant Governor Casey Cagle (R) was seeking reelection. Carol Porter won the Democratic nomination.

Republican primary
 Casey Cagle, incumbent Lieutenant Governor of Georgia (campaign website)

Primary results

Democratic primary
 Tricia Carpenter McCracken, journalist
 Carol Porter, businesswoman and wife of State House Minority Leader DuBose Porter (campaign website)

Primary results

Libertarian
 Dan Barber, self-employed
 Rhonda Martini, dentist. Dropped out due to family issues (Facebook page)

General election

Secretary of State

Incumbent Secretary of State Brian Kemp (R), who succeeded Karen Handel (R) after she resigned to focus on her gubernatorial bid, sought election to a full term and won the Republican primary on July 20. Georganna Sinkfield defeated Gail Buckner in a runoff for the Democratic nomination.

Republican primary
 Brian Kemp, incumbent Secretary of State of Georgia (campaign website)
 Doug MacGinnitie, former Sandy Springs councilman (campaign website)

Primary results

Democratic primary
 Gail Buckner, State Senator (campaign website)
 Gary Horlacher, attorney (campaign website)
 Michael Mills, public relations consultant (campaign website)
 Angela Moore, businesswoman (campaign website)
 Georganna Sinkfield, State Representative (campaign website)

Primary results

Libertarian
 David Chastain, aeronautics industry analyst (campaign website)

General election

Attorney General

Incumbent Attorney General of Georgia Thurbert Baker (D) retired from his position to run for Governor of Georgia. Ken Hodges won the Democratic nomination, while Sam Olens defeated Preston W. Smith in a runoff for the Republican nomination.

Democratic primary
 Ken Hodges, former Dougherty Circuit District Attorney (campaign website)
 Rob Teilhet, state Representative (campaign website)

Republican primary
 Sam Olens, Chairman of the Cobb County Commission (campaign website)
 Preston W. Smith, State Senator (campaign website)
 Max Wood, former U.S. Attorney (campaign website)

Libertarian candidates
 Don Smart, attorney (Facebook page)

General election

State School Superintendent
Incumbent Superintendent of Education Kathy Cox (R) originally intended to seek re-election, but on May 17 announced that she would resign effective July 1, 2010 in order to take a position as CEO of a new non-profit, the U.S. Education Delivery Institute in Washington D.C. William Bradley Bryant was appointed by Gov. Perdue to fill the vacancy, but failed to qualify to run in the November election as an independent. Joe Martin and John D. Barge won the Democratic and Republican nominations, respectively.

Candidates

Republicans
 John D. Barge, School System Administrator (campaign website)
 Richard Woods, School Administrator (campaign website)

Democrats
 Beth Farokhi, University Administrator (campaign website)
 Joe Martin, ex-school board president (campaign website)
 Brian Westlake, Teacher (campaign website)

Libertarian
 Kira Willis, teacher(campaign website)

Commissioner of Insurance
Incumbent Commissioner of Insurance John Oxendine (R) is retiring from his position to run for Governor of Georgia. Ralph Hudgens defeated Maria Sheffield in a runoff for the Republican nomination, while Mary Squires was unopposed for the Democratic nomination.

Candidates

Republicans
 Dennis Cain, Insurance Agent (campaign website)
 Rick Collum, Colquitt County Magistrate Judge (campaign website)
 Seth Harp, state Senator (campaign website)
 Ralph Hudgens, State Senator (campaign website)
 Tom Knox, state Representative (campaign website)
 John Mamalakis, Insurance Agent (campaign website)
 Stephen Northington, Insurance Agent (campaign website)
 Gerry Purcell, Health Benefits Consultant (campaign website)
 Maria Sheffield, Attorney (campaign website)

Democratic
 Mary Squires, former state Senator (campaign website)

Libertarian
 Shane Bruce, Libertarian Blogger (campaign website)

Commissioner of Agriculture
Incumbent Commissioner of Agriculture Tommy Irvin (D) is retiring in 2010. Gary Black won the Republican nomination, while J. B. Powell was unopposed for the Democratic nomination.

Candidates

Democratic
 J. B. Powell, state Senator (campaign website)

Republicans
 Gary Black, Georgia Agribusiness Council President (campaign website)
 Darwin Carter, former Reagan Administration USDA Official (campaign website)

Libertarian
 Kevin Cherry (campaign website)

Commissioner of Labor
Incumbent Commissioner of Labor Mike Thurmond (D) is retiring from his position to run for the United States Senate. Darryl Hicks narrowly won the Democratic nomination, according to unofficial results, while Mark Butler easily won the Republican nomination.

Candidates

Democrats
 Terry Coleman, Deputy Commissioner of Agriculture and former state House Speaker. (campaign website)
 Darryl Hicks, Attorney, Lobbyist, Community Activist (campaign website)

Republicans
 Mark Butler, state Representative (campaign website)
 Melvin Everson, state Representative (campaign website)

Libertarian
 William Costa (campaign website)

Georgia Public Service Commission
In 2010, one seat on the Georgia Public Service Commission will be up for election. Though candidates must come from the districts that they wish to represent on the commission, they are elected statewide.

Public Service Commissioner District 2
Incumbent second District Public Service Commissioner Bobby Baker (R) is retiring. Tim Echols defeated John Douglas in a runoff for the Republican nomination, while Keith Moffett was unopposed for the Democratic nomination.

Candidates

Republicans
 Joey Brush, Developer
 John Douglas, state Senator (campaign website)
 Tim Echols, Non-Profit Executive (campaign website)
 Jeff May, state Representative (campaign website)

Democratic
 Keith Moffett

Libertarian
 Jim Sendelbach, Psychotherapist and 2007 10th Congressional district House candidate

Georgia General Assembly

Georgia Senate

Georgia House of Representatives

Judiciary
One seat on the Supreme Court of Georgia (contested), four on the Georgia Court of Appeals (one contested), and 58 on the Georgia Superior Courts (one contested) will be up for election. All judicial elections in Georgia are officially non-partisan.
 Georgia judicial elections, 2010 at Judgepedia

Ballot measures
Two measures, both legislatively referred constitutional amendments, will be on the ballot: the Trauma Care Funding Amendment (Impose $10 fee on car registration; funds directed to trauma care centers) and the Employment Contract Enforcement Amendment (Allow the enforcement of contracts that restrict competition during or after the term of employment).
 Georgia 2010 ballot measures at Ballotpedia

References

External links
 Elections Division  at the Georgia Secretary of State
 AJC: Statewide Primary Election results
 AJC: Statewide Primary Runoff results
 Candidates for Georgia State Offices at Project Vote Smart
 Georgia Polls at Pollster.com
 Georgia Congressional Races in 2010 campaign finance data from OpenSecrets
 Georgia 2010 campaign finance data from Follow the Money

 
Georgia